Paul Edward Williams (born 15 January 1967, York, England) is an English author, television consultant, commentator, lifelong devotee to 2-Tone, ska music and the British skinhead subculture.  He is well known for his creation of The Specialized Project, a charitable portal based around ska and reggae, that raises funds for a multitude of charities and other funded projects. He is best known for writing the book You're Wondering Now - The Specials, which was published by ST Publishing in 1995, then a more concise version was released by Cherry Red Books in 2009 in time for The Specials 30th Anniversary

Williams' love of ska and 2 Tone started in 1980, when he sneaked out of his parents' home in York, and travelled to nearby Bridlington, where he saw The Specials perform live when he was 13 years old. This event had a long-lasting and profound effect on him. Throughout the late 1980s, Williams was a regular event creator. In the 1990s, he created, wrote and distributed his own quarterly ska and 2 Tone fanzine 'Street Feeling' (1994-1998) . In 1995, Williams wrote You're Wondering Now - A History of The Specials (ST Publishing). It received a few reviews in the media, including three stars from Q magazine, and was used to compile the band history section on the official Specials website. The book is now a collectors' item. He has contributed to many television programmes in the UK, and appeared as contributor on Sky TVs Trailblazers of 2Tone programme, which was narrated by Noddy Holder. He is working on a Specials docudrama for TV with Sugar Films as creative consultant. 

Williams is also often consulted by media outlets including TV companies, such as VH1 (satellite) and Channel 4 (UK terrestrial TV). He has been featured on BBC Radio 4's celebration of 2-Tone music, "Fashion Music", and was interviewed by BBC Radio Coventry, for which he contributed rare Specials tracks to the programme. His work can now be seen online, as the co-administrator for the Specials fansite and as the administrator for Roddy "Radiation" Byers' My Space profile. He designed and maintained the Ska Splash website, which was a ska festival that took place in Skegness in 2008. Williams has also promoted ska events in his hometown of York at The Junction pub, under the banner of "YorkSka Promotions" and is something he does in 2022 for The Specialized Project & The Skapones and other acts.

In 2013, he became lead vocalist with a North East ska band called The Skapones. The band went from strength to strength and, as of 2020, have released eight singles and a debut album, Cradle To Grave, with a follow up "Northern Gods" underway. The band have toured the UK, Ireland, Europe and the US in 2019, which was made into a two hour documentary. Also in 2019 the band toured with The Specials on their 40th Anniversary Tour. 2022 saw the release of the book "The Skapones-Way Out West" , a printed account of the bands adventures across Europe, UK, Ireland, USA and The Specials tour on Cosa Nostra Books written by Williams.

Bibliography
You're Wondering Now - A History of The Specials, 1995, ST Publishing, 
In Defence Of Ska , 2021 , Clash Books, Contributor  

 You're Wondering Now- The Specials From conception to reunion, 2009, Cherry Red Books
 The Skapones - Way Out West- 2019,The Specials & Stuff... , 2022, Cosa Nostra Books

External links

 The Skapones website 
 The Specialized Project
  Paul Williams Amazon Author Profile
  The Specials Online Fan Club site

1967 births
Living people
English writers about music
People from York
English male non-fiction writers
English male singers